Sempor Dam is an embankment dam on the Sempor River in District Gombong, Kebumen, Central Java Province, Republic of Indonesia. In addition to being a tourist attraction Sempor Dam is a source of irrigation water for farmers. It helps irrigate thousands of paddy fields in the delta. It also provides for flood control and has a 1 MW hydroelectric power station at its base. Construction on the dam started in 1967 but in the same year water from flash floods over-topped it, causing the dam to fail on 29 November 1967. The wave of water killed 160 people in three towns, including Magelang.    and delivered widespread damage to the area. Construction later restarted on the dam and it was completed in 1978. Its power station was later commissioned in 1980.

Tourism in Kebumen Regency

References

Dams in Indonesia
Lakes of Java
Dams completed in 1978
Energy infrastructure completed in 1980
Buildings and structures in Kebumen Regency
Hydroelectric power stations in Indonesia
Dam failures in Asia
Rock-filled dams
Landforms of Central Java
Reservoirs in Indonesia
1967 disasters in Indonesia
1967 in Indonesia